João Souza is the defending champion, but lost in the first round to Giovanni Lapentti.
Víctor Estrella of the Dominican Republic won the title over Argentinian Marco Trungelliti 2–6, 6–4, 6–4.

Seeds

Draw

Finals

Top half

Bottom half

References
 Main Draw
 Qualifying Draw

Quito Challenger - Singles
2013 Singles